Olearia stilwelliae is a species of flowering plant in the family Asteraceae and is endemic to New South Wales, Australia. It is a shrub with scattered elliptic or egg-shaped leaves, and pale blue, white and yellow, daisy-like inflorescences.

Description
The upper surface of the leaves is glabrous and the lower surface covered with felt-like hairs. Flowering occurs from June to October and the fruit is a silky-hairy achene, the pappus with 77 to 100 bristles.

Taxonomy
Olearia stilwelliae was first formally described in 1925 by William Blakely in the Proceedings of the Linnean Society of New South Wales from specimens collected at Nana Glen in 1998. The specific epithet (stilwelliae) honours "Miss Sylvia Stilwell who discovered the species with Mr. D. W. C. Shiress".

Distribution and habitat
This olearia is grows in forest from north of Grafton to Woolgoolga in north-eastern New South Wales.

References

stilwelliae
Asterales of Australia
Flora of New South Wales
Plants described in 1925
Taxa named by William Blakely